Margaret de Bohun may refer to:

Margaret of Hereford (1122/1123–1197), English noblewoman, eldest daughter of Miles de Gloucester, 1st Earl of Hereford, wife of Humphrey II de Bohun
Margaret de Bohun, Countess of Devon (1311–1391), English noblewoman, granddaughter of King Edward I and Eleanor of Castile, wife of Hugh Courtenay, 10th Earl of Devon